Lucien Chevaillier (sometimes spelled Chevallier) (21 August 1883 – 3 February 1932) was a French composer, pianist, and music journalist.

Life
Chevaillier was born in Paris and studied at the Paris Conservatoire where he received first prizes in harmony, counterpoint and fugue. He taught for many years at the École normale de musique (Paris), the Strasbourg Conservatory, and was director of the École de musique at Belfort. He also wrote articles, reviews and conducted interviews for French music journals including "Le Guide du concert". He died in Paris.

He is best known for his music for piano, particularly his Berceuse, Op. 65. His one act opera Le Poème du soir premiered successfully at the Opéra-Comique in Paris on 13 May 1925.

Bibliography
Key, Pierre V. (ed): "Chevaillier, Lucien" in Pierre Key's Musical Who's Who (New York: Pierre Key Inc., 1931), p. 120.

References

External links
 Chevaillier, Lucien on MusicSack
 

1883 births
1932 deaths
20th-century French male classical pianists
Academic staff of the École Normale de Musique de Paris
Burials at Père Lachaise Cemetery
Composers for piano
Conservatoire de Paris alumni
French male classical composers
French opera composers
Male opera composers
Musicians from Paris